Samu Alanko Zarta (born 16 May 1998) is a Finnish footballer who plays as a winger or attacker for VPS.

Career

Alanko started his career with Finnish top flight side VPS, where he made 9 appearances and scored 1 goal. On 11 February 2015, Alanko debuted for VPS during a 0-1 loss to SJK. On 20 February 2016, he scored his first goal for VPS during a 2-0 win over Kemi City FC.

In 2015, Alanko is sent on loan to Kiisto in the Finnish third division.

In 2016, he was sent on loan to Finnish second division club Jaro.

In 2018, he returned to VPS in the Finnish top flight after playing for Austrian third division team Austria II.

On 13 July 2022, Alanko returned to VPS once again.

References

External links

 
 

1998 births
Association football forwards
Association football wingers
Expatriate footballers in Austria
Austrian Regionalliga players
Finnish expatriate sportspeople in Austria
Veikkausliiga players
Living people
Ykkönen players
Kakkonen players
First Vienna FC players
AC Oulu players
FF Jaro players
FC Kiisto players
Vaasan Palloseura players
Finnish footballers